The Pir Panjal Region is a region and proposed administrative division located south-western part of the Pir Panjal Range in the Jammu Division of Indian-administered Kashmir

Name
The Pir Panjal range is named after the Pir Panjal Pass, whose original name as recorded by Srivara, is Panchaladeva (IAST: Pāñcāladeva, meaning the deity of Panchala). Panchala is a country mentioned in the Mahabharata in the northwest Uttar Pradesh. However, there are also traditions that place the Mahabharata regions in western Punjab and southern Kashmir. Scholar Dineshchandra Sircar has analysed the geography described in the Shakti‐sangama Tantra, where this is indeed the case.Scholar M. A. Stein believes that the concept of deity must have been translated into that of a Pir after the region was Islamised.

Geography
The Pir Panjal Region includes the districts of Poonch and Rajouri.

Demographics
Muslims form a majority in the two districts constituting pir panjal region.About 75% of the population was Muslim according to the 2011 census, and the rest were 22.73% Hindus and 2.38% sikhs.

Tourism
Pir Panjal is also the hub of hilly tourist attractions after Valley of Kashmir & Chenab Valley, some of them are as follows;

Pir Ki Gali
Shrine of Sayin Miran Baksh
Shrine of Baba Ghulams Shah Badshah(Shahdara Sharief)
Chingus Sarai
Noori Chambh
Loran Valley
Budha Amarnath
Poonch Fort
Historic Mughal Road

Demand For Divisional Status
There has been a movement demanding divisional for the Pir Panjal by various social and political activists for a long time. The demand rose in 2018 and 2019 when Ladakh got divisional status and the former Chief Minister of Jammu and Kashmir, Omar Abdullah added "Two Separate Divisional Status for Chenab Valley and Pir Panjal Region" to his party's political agenda.

As of 2021, the movement for of divisional status or merger with Kashmir Division again increased after rumours of second bifurcation of J&K and demand for a separate state of Jammu.The majority of people in Pir Panjal are ethnic Paharis & Gujjars and are more connected to their Kashmir Valley brethren by religion, culture, connectivity, geography & historical links with Kashmir.

There is a common reason for this demand. People allege negligence in terms of developmental issues by the government if the Pir Panjal remains linked to the Jammu division.

Hill Development Council
In 1996, Dr. Farooq Abdullah as Chief minister promised administrative autonomy to Chenab & Pir Panjal.

References

Geography of Jammu and Kashmir